Lee Sang-min (born June 24, 1973) is a South Korean singer, songwriter, record producer and television personality. He is a former member of the hip hop and dance group Roo'ra. He is also best known for being a cast member of the variety shows Knowing Bros and My Little Old Boy.

Career

Lee debuted with mix group Roo'ra in 1993 and hit the top with popular song "Angel Without The Wing" and "Three!Four!".

In the late 1990s and early 2000s, Lee was the most successful producer along with Yang Hyun-suk. He produced many hit groups like Country Kko Kko, Chakra, and Sharp at his company Sangmind. Lee is also the one who scouted popular actress Jung Ryeo-won of Chakra and Hwangbo and Tak Jae-hoon of Country Kko Kko.

On March 27, 2018, MBC Every1 announced that Lee would be joining the cast of Weekly Idol as a host, following a revamp to the series.

On April 11, 2018, Mnet announced that Lee was going to join the upcoming music TV program The Call as a host.

On December 18, 2021, Lee won the Grand Prize (Daesang) with the My Little Old Boy team (Shin Dong-yup, Seo Jang-hoon, Cho Hye-seon, Kim Sun-ja, Park Young-hye, Lee Sang-min, Tak Jae-hoon, Im Won-hee, Kim Joon-ho, Kim Jong-kook, Kim Hee-chul, Lee Tae-sung, Oh Min-suk, Park Goon, Choi Jin-hyuk) at the 2021 SBS Entertainment Awards.

Personal life
In 1995, Lee, who was a member of Roo'ra at the time, attempted suicide following allegations that one of their songs plagiarized Ninja's debut song Omatsuri.

On June 19, 2004, Lee married actress and singer Lee Hye-young, whom he met in the U.S. in 1996 and dated for seven years. However, on August 8, 2005, the couple divorced, stating personality differences. In August 2006, Lee was sued by his ex-wife for fraud charges and taking about 2.2 billion won prior to their marriage and until their divorce. In the suit, Lee Hye-young claimed that her ex-husband bought a Volvo worth 80 million won and a BMW worth 100 million won under her name, for which he did not repay the installment debt and caused money to be seized from her broadcasting payment and bank account. In the suit, Lee also claimed that her ex-husband forced her to pose as a
nude model for business purposes, taking 50 million won (~$50,000) for the contract and 30 million won (~$30,000) worth of benefits from the
project. On November 28, 2006, Lee Hye-young dropped the charges against her ex-husband.

In December 2006, the police arrested Lee on the suspicion of operating a gambling website and receiving 210 million won in proceeds. In 2009, he was sentenced to one and a half years in prison. However, Lee appealed the ruling, and was then sentenced to 3 years in probation, 160 hours in community service, and 210 million won in fines.

Lee started a mega-restaurant featuring live martial arts battles and drag shows; however, the restaurant failed in 2005 and landed Lee in debts of 6.9 billion won.

Discography
 Blues Along the Way (2018)

Filmography

Film

TV series

Variety shows

Ambassadorship 
 Busan's footwear industry ambassador (2022)

Awards and nominations

Notes

References

External links

1973 births
Living people
South Korean television personalities
South Korean dance musicians
South Korean record producers
Weekly Idol members
21st-century South Korean male singers
South Korean male idols